The Breguet 16 was a bomber biplane produced in France toward the end of World War I.

Design and development
The design of the Breguet 16 was essentially a scaled-up version of Breguet's highly successful 14 — a conventionally configured biplane with two-bay, unstaggered, equal-span wings. Trials in 1918 proved promising, and mass production by several French manufacturers, under licence from Breguet, was planned for 1919. These plans were discarded upon the Armistice, but more limited production was revived in the early 1920s as the French Air Force began a programme of modernisation.

Operational history
In service, the single-engine Breguet 16 was used to replace obsolete twin-engine Farman F.50s in the night bomber role as the Bre.16Bn.2. Some of the 200 aircraft built were deployed to Syria and Morocco, and Breguet also managed to sell some to the military air arms of China and Czechoslovakia. A single Breguet 16 was acquired by the Portuguese Air Force in 1924 for the Lisbon-Macau Raid, an attempted flight between Portugal and Macau, but the attempt failed, with the aircraft being destroyed in a forced landing in India.

Variants
Bre.16Bn.2
Night bomber version.

Operators

Chinese Nationalist Air Force

Czech Air Force

French Air Force

Portuguese Air Force

Specifications

References

Notes

Bibliography

 Taylor, John W. R. and Jean Alexander. Combat Aircraft of the World. New York: G.P. Putnam's Sons, 1969. . 
 Taylor, Michael J. H. Jane's Encyclopedia of Aviation. London: Studio Editions, 1989. .
 World Aircraft Information Files. London: Bright Star Publishing, File 890, Sheet 80–81.

1910s French bomber aircraft
 0016
Single-engined tractor aircraft
Biplanes with negative stagger
Aircraft first flown in 1918